Koine Greek (    or  ; Koine), also known as Hellenistic Greek, common Attic, the Alexandrian dialect, Biblical Greek or New Testament Greek, was the common supra-regional form of Greek spoken and written during the Hellenistic period, the Roman Empire and the early Byzantine Empire. It evolved from the spread of Greek following the conquests of Alexander the Great in the fourth century BC, and served as the lingua franca of much of the Mediterranean region and the Middle East during the following centuries. It was based mainly on Attic and related Ionic speech forms, with various admixtures brought about through dialect levelling with other varieties.

Koine Greek included styles ranging from conservative literary forms to the spoken vernaculars of the time. As the dominant language of the Byzantine Empire, it developed further into Medieval Greek, which then turned into Modern Greek.

Literary Koine was the medium of much post-classical Greek literary and scholarly writing, such as the works of Plutarch and Polybius. Koine is also the language of the Septuagint (the 3rd century BC Greek translation of the Hebrew Bible), the Christian New Testament, and of most early Christian theological writing by the Church Fathers. In this context, Koine Greek is also known as "Biblical", "New Testament", "ecclesiastical", or "patristic" Greek. The Roman Emperor Marcus Aurelius also wrote his private thoughts in Koine Greek in a work that is now known as The Meditations. Koine Greek continues to be used as the liturgical language of services in the Greek Orthodox Church and in some Greek Catholic churches.

Name 
The English-language name Koine is derived from the Koine Greek term , meaning "the common dialect". The Greek word  itself means "common".

Ancient scholars used the term koine in several different senses. Scholars such as Apollonius Dyscolus (second century AD) and Aelius Herodianus (second century AD) maintained the term koine to refer to the Proto-Greek language, while others used it to refer to any vernacular form of Greek speech which differed somewhat from the literary language.

When Koine Greek became a language of literature by the first century BC, some people distinguished two forms: written as the literary post-classical form (which should not be confused with Atticism), and vernacular as the day-to-day vernacular. Others chose to refer to Koine as "the dialect of Alexandria" or "Alexandrian dialect", or even the universal dialect of its time. Modern classicists have often used the former sense.

Origins and history 

Koine Greek arose as a common dialect within the armies of Alexander the Great. Under the leadership of Macedon, their newly formed common variety was spoken from the Ptolemaic Kingdom of Egypt to the Seleucid Empire of Mesopotamia. It replaced existing ancient Greek dialects with an everyday form that people anywhere could understand. Though elements of Koine Greek took shape in Classical Greece, the post-Classical period of Greek is defined as beginning with the death of Alexander the Great in 323 BC, when cultures under Greek sway in turn began to influence the language.

The passage into the next period, known as Medieval Greek, is sometimes dated from the foundation of Constantinople by Constantine the Great in 330 AD, but often only from the end of late antiquity. The post-Classical period of Greek thus refers to the creation and evolution of Koine Greek throughout the entire Hellenistic and Roman eras of history until the start of the Middle Ages.

The linguistic roots of the Common Greek dialect had been unclear since ancient times. During the Hellenistic period, most scholars thought of Koine as the result of the mixture of the four main Ancient Greek dialects, "" (the composition of the Four).

The view accepted by most scholars today was given by the Greek linguist Georgios Hatzidakis, who showed that despite the "composition of the Four", the "stable nucleus" of Koine Greek is Attic. In other words, Koine Greek can be regarded as Attic with the admixture of elements especially from Ionic, but also from other dialects. The degree of importance of the non-Attic linguistic elements on Koine can vary depending on the region of the Hellenistic world.

In that respect, the varieties of Koine spoken in the Ionian colonies of Anatolia (e.g. Pontus, cf. Pontic Greek) would have more intense Ionic characteristics than others and those of Laconia and Cyprus would preserve some Doric and Arcadocypriot characteristics, respectively. The literary Koine of the Hellenistic age resembles Attic in such a degree that it is often mentioned as Common Attic.

Sources 
The first scholars who studied Koine, both in Alexandrian and Early Modern times, were classicists whose prototype had been the literary Attic Greek of the Classical period and frowned upon any other variety of Ancient Greek. Koine Greek was therefore considered a decayed form of Greek which was not worthy of attention.

The reconsideration on the historical and linguistic importance of Koine Greek began only in the early 19th century, where renowned scholars conducted a series of studies on the evolution of Koine throughout the entire Hellenistic period and Roman Empire. The sources used on the studies of Koine have been numerous and of unequal reliability. The most significant ones are the inscriptions of the post-Classical periods and the papyri, for being two kinds of texts which have authentic content and can be studied directly.

Other significant sources are the Septuagint, the Greek translation of the Hebrew Bible, and the Greek New Testament. The teaching of these texts was aimed at the most common people, and for that reason, they use the most popular language of the era.

Other sources can be based on random findings such as inscriptions on vases written by popular painters, mistakes made by Atticists due to their imperfect knowledge of Attic Greek or even some surviving Greco-Latin glossaries of the Roman period, e.g.:

Finally, a very important source of information on the ancient Koine is the modern Greek language with all its dialects and its own Koine form, which have preserved some of the ancient language's oral linguistic details which the written tradition has lost.

Dialects from the southern part of the Greek-speaking regions (Dodecanese, Cyprus, etc.), preserve the pronunciation of the double similar consonants, while others pronounce in many words υ as ου or preserve ancient double forms ( etc.). Linguistic phenomena like the above imply that those characteristics survived within Koine, which in turn had countless variations in the Greek-speaking world.

Types

Biblical Koine 
Biblical Koine refers to the varieties of Koine Greek used in Bible translations into Greek and related texts. Its main sources are:
 The Septuagint, a 3rd century BC Greek translation of the Hebrew Bible (Old Testament) and texts not included in the Hebrew Bible;
 The Greek New Testament, compiled originally in Greek.

Septuagint Greek 

There has been some debate to what degree Biblical Greek represents the mainstream of contemporary spoken Koine and to what extent it contains specifically Semitic substratum features. These could have been induced either through the practice of translating closely from Biblical Hebrew or Aramaic originals, or through the influence of the regional non-standard Greek spoken by originally Aramaic-speaking Hellenized Jews.

Some features of Biblical Greek which are thought to have originally been non-standard elements eventually found their way into the main of the Greek language.

S. J. Thackeray, in A Grammar of the Old Testament in Greek According to the Septuagint (1909), wrote that only the five books of the Pentateuch, parts of the Book of Joshua and the Book of Isaiah may be considered "good Koine". One issue debated by scholars is whether and how much the translation of the Pentateuch influenced the rest of the Septuagint, including the translation of Isaiah.

Old Testament scholar James Barr has been critical of etymological arguments that  refers to "the community called by God to constitute his People". Kyriakoula Papademetriou explains:

New Testament Greek 

The authors of the New Testament follow the Septuagint translations for over half their quotations from the Old Testament.

The "historical present" tense is a term used for present tense verbs that are used in some narrative sections of the New Testament to describe events that are in the past with respect to the speaker. This is seen more in works attributed to Mark and John than Luke. It is used 151 times in the Gospel of Mark in passages where a reader might expect a past tense verb. Scholars have presented various explanations for this; in the early 20th century some scholars argued that the use of the historical present tense in Mark was due to the influence of Aramaic, but this theory fell out of favor in the 1960s. Another group of scholars believed the historical present tense was used to heighten the dramatic effect, and this interpretation was favored in the New American Bible translation. In Volume II of the 1929 edition of A Grammar of the New Testament, W.F. Howard argues that the heavy use of the historical present in Herodotus and Thucydides, compared with the relatively infrequent usage by Polybius and Xenophon was evidence that heavy use of this verb tense is a feature of vernacular Koine, but other scholars have argued that the historical present can be a literary form to "denote semantic shifts to more prominent material."

Patristic Greek 
The term patristic Greek is sometimes used for the Greek written by the Greek Church Fathers, the Early Christian theologians in late antiquity. Christian writers in the earliest time tended to use a simple register of Koiné, relatively close to the spoken language of their time, following the model of the Bible. After the 4th century, when Christianity became the state church of the Roman Empire, more learned registers of Koiné also came to be used.

Differences between Attic and Koine Greek 
Koine differs from Ancient Greek in many ways: grammar, word formation, vocabulary and phonology (sound system).

Differences in grammar

Phonology 

During the period generally designated as Koine Greek, a great deal of phonological change occurred. At the start of the period, the pronunciation was virtually identical to Ancient Greek phonology, whereas in the end, it had much more in common with Modern Greek phonology.

The three most significant changes were the loss of vowel length distinction, the replacement of the pitch accent system by a stress accent system, and the monophthongization of several diphthongs:
The ancient distinction between long and short vowels was gradually lost, and from the second century BC all vowels were isochronic (having equal length).
From the second century BC, the Ancient Greek pitch accent was replaced with a stress accent.
Psilosis: loss of rough breathing, . Rough breathing had already been lost in the Ionic Greek varieties of Anatolia and the Aeolic Greek of Lesbos.
The diphthongs  and  came to be pronounced  (via ), but are partly assimilated to  before the voiceless consonants .
Simple vowels mostly preserved their ancient pronunciations. These changes are known as iotacism.
, which were originally pronounced , became the fricatives  (via ), which they still are today, except when preceded by a nasal consonant (μ, ν); in that case, they retain their ancient pronunciations (e.g. ,).

New Testament Greek phonology 
The Koine Greek in the table represents a reconstruction of New Testament Koine Greek, deriving to some degree from the dialect spoken in Judea and Galilee during the first century and similar to the dialect spoken in Alexandria, Egypt. The realizations of certain phonemes differ from the more standard Attic dialect of Koine.

 has spirantized, with palatal allophone before front-vowels and a plosive allophone after nasals, while  is beginning to develop a fricative articulation intervocalically.   and  still preserve their ancient aspirated plosive values, while the unaspirated stops  have perhaps begun to develop voiced allophones after nasals. Initial aspiration has also likely become an optional sound for many speakers of the popular variety.

Sample Koine texts 
The following texts show differences from Attic Greek in all aspects – grammar, morphology, vocabulary and can be inferred to show differences in phonology.

The following comments illustrate the phonological development within the period of Koine. The phonetic transcriptions are tentative and are intended to illustrate two different stages in the reconstructed development, an early conservative variety still relatively close to Classical Attic, and a somewhat later, more progressive variety approaching Modern Greek in some respects.

Sample 1 – A Roman decree 
The following excerpt, from a decree of the Roman Senate to the town of Thisbae in Boeotia in 170 BC, is rendered in a reconstructed pronunciation representing a hypothetical conservative variety of mainland Greek Koiné in the early Roman period.

Sample 2 – Greek New Testament 
The following excerpt, the beginning of the Gospel of John, is rendered in a reconstructed pronunciation representing a progressive popular variety of Koiné in the early Christian era.

References

Notes

Citations

Bibliography 
 Abel, F.-M. Grammaire du grec biblique.
 Allen, W. Sidney, Vox Graeca: a guide to the pronunciation of classical Greek – 3rd ed., Cambridge University Press, 1987. 
 Andriotis, Nikolaos P. History of the Greek Language
 Buth, Randall, : Koine Greek of Early Roman Period
 Bruce, Frederick F. The Books and the Parchments: Some Chapters on the Transmission of the Bible. 3rd ed. Westwood, NJ: Revell, 1963.  Chapters 2 and 5.
 Conybeare, F.C. and Stock, St. George. Grammar of Septuagint Greek: With Selected Readings, Vocabularies, and Updated Indexes.
 Horrocks, Geoffrey C. (2010). Greek: A history of the language and its speakers (2nd ed.). Oxford: Blackwell.
 .

Further reading
Bakker, Egbert J., ed. 2010. A companion to the Ancient Greek language. Oxford: Wiley-Blackwell.
Blass, Friedrich, and Albert Debrunner. 1961. Greek grammar of the New Testament and other early Christian literature. Translated and revised by R. W. Funk. Chicago: University of Chicago Press.
Christidis, Anastasios-Phoivos, ed. 2007. A history of Ancient Greek: From the beginnings to Late Antiquity. Cambridge, UK: Cambridge University Press.
Colvin, Stephen C. 2007. A historical Greek reader: Mycenaean to the koiné. Oxford: Oxford University Press.
Easterling, P. E., and Carol Handley. 2001. Greek Scripts: An Illustrated Introduction. London: Society for the Promotion of Hellenic Studies.
Evans, T. V., and Dirk Obbink, eds. 2009. The language of the papyri. Oxford: Oxford Univ. Press.
Gignac, Francis T. 1976–1981. A grammar of the Greek papyri of the Roman and Byzantine periods. 2 vols. Milan: Cisalpino-La Goliardica.
Horrocks, Geoffrey. 2010. Greek: A history of the language and its speakers. 2nd ed. Oxford: Wiley-Blackwell.
Palmer, Leonard R. 1980. The Greek language. London: Faber & Faber.
Stevens, Gerald L. 2009. New Testament Greek Intermediate: From Morphology to Translation. Cambridge, UK: Lutterworth Press.
––––. 2009. New Testament Greek Primer. Cambridge, UK: Lutterworth Press.

External links 
 

 New Testament Greek Online by Winfred P. Lehmann and Jonathan Slocum, free online lessons at the Linguistics Research Center at the University of Texas at Austin
Free Koine Greek Keyboard – A unicode keyboard originally developed by Char Matejovsky for use by Westar Institute scholars
The Biblical Greek Forum – An online community for Biblical Greek
Greek-Language.com – Dictionaries, manuscripts of the Greek New Testament, and tools for applying linguistics to the study of Hellenistic Greek
Diglot A daily di-glot or tri-glot (Vulgate) reading

 
Languages attested from the 3rd century BC
Hellenistic civilization
Hellenism and Christianity
Christian liturgical languages
Greek
Languages of ancient Macedonia
Languages of Syria
Languages of Egypt
Languages of Sicily
Varieties of Ancient Greek